Broad On (Ѻ ѻ; italics: Ѻ ѻ) is a positional and orthographical variant of the Cyrillic letter O (О о) (here "on" (onŭ) is a traditional name of Cyrillic letter О; these names are still in use in the Church Slavonic alphabet).

Broad On is used only in the Church Slavonic language. In its alphabet (in primers and grammar books), broad and regular shapes of О/о share the same position, as they are not considered different letters. Uppercase is typically represented by broad Ѻ, and lowercase is either regular о or dual: both broad ѻ and regular о (in the same way as Greek uppercase Σ is accompanied with two lowercases σ, ς). Phonetically, broad Ѻ/ѻ is the same as regular О/о.

In standard Church Slavonic orthography (since the middle of the 17th century until present time), the broad shape of letter On is used instead of the regular shape of the same letter in the following cases:
 as the first letter of a word's root, which could fall:
 at the beginning of the word:,
 after a prefix:,
 after another root in compound words;
 in the middle of the root in two geographical names (—Jordan River, —city of Jaffa) and their derivatives;
 as the numerical sign to represent the number 70.
(However, Church Slavonic editions printed outside the Russian Empire have often ignored the last rule and used regular о as the numerical sign).

Historically, Broad On was also used in the later Old Russian period, including documents, letters and other vernacular texts, to signal the initial position of a word or a syllable or occasionally to mark a closed vowel (developed in North Russian dialects since the 14th century). It is found in birch bark manuscripts and in some other Russian texts. Other glyphs could be used in the same functions, including Monocular O and Cyrillic Omega.

Name
Broad On has no standard traditional name. The names used in literature (broad/wide/round/initial on/o etc.) are just shape-based or functional descriptions. A name from certain Russian sources, он польское, on pol'skoye (literally, "Polish O"), also points to the round shape of the letter, because Latin fonts from Poland had round "O", and the typical old Cyrillic "O" was lens-shaped and condensed. Now the character is often being referred to by its conventional Unicode name "Round Omega", the fact that may lead to certain misunderstanding, because the Cyrillic letter Omega is a completely different letter; in particular, its numerical value is 800, not 70.

Computing codes

References